Odontogenic ameloblast-associated protein is a protein that in humans is encoded by the ODAM gene.

References

Further reading